The Special State Protection Service of Georgia (SSPS) ( [სდსს]) is a militarized government agency of Georgia tasked with the protection of several, mandated by the relevant law, high-ranking state officials, including the President of Georgia, as well as certain national properties, high-ranking foreign visitors and diplomatic offices. It is mostly subordinated to the Parliament of Georgia, with only the part responsible for the incumbent president's security being under the authority of the President of Georgia.

History
The predecessor of the Special State Protection Service was the Government Protective Service of the Republic of Georgia (საქართველოს რესპუბლიკის სამთავრობო დაცვის სამსახური) formed on June 23 1994 on the basis of the Government Protective Directorate of the Ministry of State Security of Georgia. On February 20, 1996 the agency adopted the current name in line with the "Law of Georgia on Special State Protection Service".

In 1998, the SSPS was further tasked with providing security to the ongoing energy projects in Georgia, such as the Baku–Tbilisi–Ceyhan pipeline. This function was transferred to the Main Division for Protection of Strategic Pipelines of the Ministry of Internal Affairs on January 1, 2006.
 
The agency has lost 7 personnel in the line of duty. Of these, two were killed in the attack on the then-President Eduard Shevardnadze's motorcade in Tbilisi on February 9, 1998.

Heads of the service
Lieutenant-General Vakhtang Kutateladze, 1994—1998
Lieutenant-General Sulkhan Papashvili, 1998—2003
Major-General Giorgi Aleksidze, 2003—2004
Lieutenant-General Otar Kvelidze, 2004—2010
Major-General Teimuraz Janashia, 2010—2013
Vice-Colonel Anzor Chubinidze, 2013—2014
Colonel Teimuraz Mghebrishvili, 2014
Colonel Anzor Chubinidze, 2015 until now

Functions
The Special State Protection Service provides security to: 
 the leading officials from executive, legislative and judiciary bodies of Georgia,
 the buildings, structures and the adjoining territories belonging to the government of Georgia,
 the visiting high-ranking foreign officials, representatives of the international organisations, and other important persons,
 the places, temporary or permanent, where the Georgian government or officials reside.    

The persons subjected to protection are:
President of Georgia
Chairperson of the Parliament of Georgia
Prime Minister of Georgia
Chairperson of the Constitutional Court of Georgia
Chairperson of the Supreme Court of Georgia
Catholicos-Patriarch of the Georgian Orthodox Church
Minister of Justice of Georgia
Heads of the supreme legislative and executive authority of Abkhazia and Adjara 
Head of Administration of the President of Georgia
Permanent members of the National Security Council of Georgia  
Heads of foreign states, visiting Georgia
Candidates for Presidency of Georgia during pre-election campaign and elections.
By decision of the President of Georgia, personal security may by provided to:
Deputy Chairperson of the Parliament of Georgia, members of the Parliament, members of the Government, other high-ranking officials as well as their family members if the evidence suggests threat to their lives and health;
Highest-ranking foreign officials and representatives of international organizations;
Heads of diplomatic missions to Georgia;
Family members of former high-ranking officials as mandated by a special law.

References

Protective security units
Government of Georgia (country)
Government agencies established in 1994
1994 establishments in Georgia (country)